The 1939 Tour de France was the 33rd edition of Tour de France, one of cycling's Grand Tours. The Tour began in Paris with a flat stage on 10 July, and Stage 11 occurred on 22 July with a flat stage from Montpellier. The race finished in Paris on 30 July.

Stage 11
22 July 1939 — Montpellier to Marseille,

Stage 12a
23 July 1939 — Marseille to Saint-Raphaël,

Stage 12b
23 July 1939 — Saint-Raphaël to Monaco,

Stage 13
24 July 1939 — Monaco to Monaco,

Stage 14
25 July 1939 — Monaco to Digne,

Stage 15
26 July 1939 — Digne to Briançon,

Stage 16a
27 July 1939 — Briançon to Briançon,

Stage 16b
27 July 1939 — Bonneval to Bourg-Saint-Maurice,  (ITT)

Stage 16c
27 July 1939 — Bourg-Saint-Maurice to Annecy,

Stage 17a
29 July 1939 — Annecy to Dôle,

Stage 17b
29 July 1939 — Dôle to Dijon,  (ITT)

Stage 18a
30 July 1939 — Dijon to Troyes,

Stage 18b
30 July 1939 — Troyes to Paris,

References

1939 Tour de France
Tour de France stages